Corrosion Science is a peer-reviewed scientific journal published by Elsevier in 16 issues per year. Established in 1961, it covers a wide range of topics in the study of pure/applied corrosion and corrosion engineering, including but not limited to oxidation, biochemical corrosion, stress corrosion cracking ,and corrosion control methods, as well as surface science and engineering. The editors-in-chief are J.M.C. Mol (Delft University of Technology) and O.R. Mattos (Federal University of Rio de Janeiro).

Abstracting and indexing
The journal is abstracted and indexed in:
Chemical Abstracts
Current Contents/Engineering, Computing & Technology
Inspec
Materials Science Citation Index
Scopus

According to the Journal Citation Reports, the journal has a 2020 impact factor of 7.205.

References

External links

English-language journals
Publications established in 1961
Elsevier academic journals
Journals published between 13 and 25 times per year
Chemical engineering journals
Materials science journals
Corrosion